Running Springs is a census-designated place (CDP) in San Bernardino County, California, United States. The population was 5,268 at the 2020 census, up from 4,862 at the 2010 census. Running Springs is situated 17 miles west of the city of Big Bear Lake.

Running Springs is home to the 3,400-acre National Children’s Forest, which offers interpretive programs, educational tours and more. Snow Valley Mountain Resort was established here in the 1920s and was the first ski resort in the San Bernardino Mountains.

History
The first people to settle here were the Serrano people (“mountain people”). They got their name from Spanish priest Father Garces in 1776, but called themselves Yuhaviatam (“people of the pines”). Numerous mortar holes can be seen throughout the area, made by the Serranos grinding acorns into meal. Native Americans settled here due to the rich natural resources. They gathered acorns and herbs, also hunting deer, rabbits and other wildlife.

Running Springs was originally known as Hunsaker Flats, named for Abraham Hunsaker, an early member of a Mormon Battalion. The area was developed after improvements to the state highways in the 1920s.

Geography
Running Springs is located at  (34.207739, -117.108285).

According to the United States Census Bureau, the CDP has a total area of 4.2 square miles (10.9 km), 99.79% of it is land and 0.21% is water.

Demographics

2010
At the 2010 census Running Springs had a population of 4,862. The racial makeup of Running Springs was 4,325 (89.0%) White (79.8% Non-Hispanic White), 23 (0.5%) African American, 47 (1.0%) Native American, 50 (1.0%) Asian, 6 (0.1%) Pacific Islander, 146 (3.0%) from other races, and 265 (5.5%) from two or more races. Hispanic or Latino of any race were 695 people (14.3%).

The whole population lived in households, no one lived in non-institutionalized group quarters and no one was institutionalized.

There were 1,944 households, 611 (31.4%) had children under the age of 18 living in them, 1,026 (52.8%) were opposite-sex married couples living together, 171 (8.8%) had a female householder with no husband present, 106 (5.5%) had a male householder with no wife present.  There were 114 (5.9%) unmarried opposite-sex partnerships, and 38 (2.0%) same-sex married couples or partnerships. 477 households (24.5%) were one person and 140 (7.2%) had someone living alone who was 65 or older. The average household size was 2.50.  There were 1,303 families (67.0% of households); the average family size was 2.99.

The age distribution was 1,119 people (23.0%) under the age of 18, 375 people (7.7%) aged 18 to 24, 1,157 people (23.8%) aged 25 to 44, 1,672 people (34.4%) aged 45 to 64, and 539 people (11.1%) who were 65 or older.  The median age was 41.7 years. For every 100 females, there were 105.5 males.  For every 100 females age 18 and over, there were 103.4 males.

There were 3,729 housing units at an average density of 885.1 per square mile, of the occupied units 1,419 (73.0%) were owner-occupied and 525 (27.0%) were rented. The homeowner vacancy rate was 5.3%; the rental vacancy rate was 12.6%.  3,450 people (71.0% of the population) lived in owner-occupied housing units and 1,412 people (29.0%) lived in rental housing units.

According to the 2010 United States Census, Running Springs had a median household income of $59,111, with 9.3% of the population living below the federal poverty line.

2000
At the 2000 census there were 5,125 people, 1,903 households, and 1,366 families in the CDP. The population density was 1,286.1 inhabitants per square mile (497.2/km). The racial makeup of the CDP was 87.7% White, 0.5% African American, 1.7% Native American, 0.9% Asian, 0.1% Pacific Islander, 4.1% from other races, and 5.1% from two or more races. Hispanic or Latino of any race were 11.1%.

Of the 1,903 households 35.4% had children under the age of 18 living with them, 56.2% were married couples living together, 10.5% had a female householder with no husband present, and 28.2% were non-families. 21.5% of households were one person and 5.3% were one person aged 65 or older.  The average household size was 2.61 and the average family size was 3.04.

The age distribution was 27.4% under the age of 18, 7.4% from 18 to 24, 28.8% from 25 to 44, 27.6% from 45 to 64, and 8.7% 65 or older.  The median age was 38 years. For every 100 females, there were 102.9 males.  For every 100 females age 18 and over, there were 102.3 males.

The median household income was $50,524 and the median family income  was $56,855. Males had a median income of $45,172 versus $34,492 for females. The per capita income for the CDP was $22,231.  About 7.0% of families and 8.8% of the population were below the poverty line, including 7.7% of those under age 18 and 9.9% of those age 65 or over.

Government

Surroundings and economy 
Running Springs is a mountain community in the San Bernardino Mountains. It is an inholding in the San Bernardino National Forest. Situated at the junction of State Route 18 and State Route 330, it is a major gateway to the mountain communities of Lake Arrowhead, Arrowbear, Green Valley Lake, and Big Bear and is the closest community to Snow Valley Mountain Resort. While there is no primary industry in Running Springs, there are service industries geared to the tourism market, as the San Bernardino National Forest is a year-round tourist destination.

Additionally, Running Springs, together with surrounding communities, form a bedroom community for commuters who are employed in San Bernardino.

Running Springs is a member community of the Rim of the World, an inhabited stretch of the San Bernardino Mountains and wholly contained in the San Bernardino National Forest. Running Springs is served by Rim of the World High School and Mary Putnam Henck Intermediate School situated in Lake Arrowhead.

Logging in the San Bernardino Mountains was once done on a large scale, with the Brookings Lumber Company operation the largest. It built a logging railroad to bring logs to the mill at Fredalba. The Shay locomotives had to be disassembled and hauled by wagon up the mountain, since the railroad operated in the high country but did not connect to other railroads in the lowlands. About 60% of the finished lumber was hauled by wagon down the steep grades to the Molino box factory in Highland, which made packing crates for the citrus grown in the area. The remaining 40% went to the company's retail lumber yard in San Bernardino. In 1912, the company dismantled the Fredalba sawmill and moved much of the machinery to Brookings, Oregon.

In popular culture

Film producer David O. Selznick lived in Running Springs and decided to use neighboring Big Bear Lake for scenes in his 1939 film Gone With the Wind. Movies filmed in Running Springs include Next (2007), When a Stranger Calls (2006), Communion (1989), Small Town Saturday Night (2010), I'm Reed Fish (2006), Messenger of Death (1988), Demon Legacy (2014), The Bigfoot Project (2017) and Cold Cabin (2010).

The film Running Springs was set and filmed in the Running Springs area.

Sister cities
 Sehmatal, Germany

See also
 Big Bear Discovery Center

References

External links
 Big Bear Discovery Center
 Big Bear Grizzly, in depth news, sports and entertainment information
 Big Bear Valley Historical Museum Web site

San Bernardino Mountains
Census-designated places in San Bernardino County, California
Census-designated places in California